Garrett Paul Mason (born June 19, 1985) is an American politician from Maine. A Republican, Mason formerly served in the Maine State Senate from the 22nd District, representing part of Androscoggin County, including his residence in Lisbon Falls. In 2003, he graduated from Calvary Christian Academy in Turner. In 2006, Mason graduated from Pensacola Christian College in Pensacola, Florida with a B.A. in marketing. He also completed graduate work at Southern New Hampshire University and the Art Institute of Pittsburgh. After college, Mason worked for the AA baseball team Portland Sea Dogs and as director of administration for the QJMHL hockey team Lewiston Maineiacs. He also received at honorary doctorate in Humanities from Pensacola Christian College in 2018.

In November 2010, Mason defeated incumbent Democrat and Leeds dairy farmer John Nutting. The Maine Republican Party spent $50,000 on television and radio ads against Nutting.

During his first term in the Maine Senate, Mason sponsored a bill to allow charter schools in Maine. It was signed by Governor Paul LePage in June 2011.

Mason was re-elected in 2012 by 28 votes over Democrat Colleen Quint of Minot.

In June 2013, upon news that incumbent Congressman Mike Michaud had taken steps towards running for governor, Mason was said to be "seriously considering a run" for the Republican nomination.

After Republicans took control of the Maine Senate in 2014, Mason was elected Senate Majority Leader, a position he held until he termed out in 2018.

Family
Mason's mother Gina Mason and their cousin Dale J. Crafts also served in the Maine Legislature. After his mother died in September 2017, his father Rick Mason won a special election to fill her vacant seat.

References

1985 births
21st-century American politicians
Art Institute of Pittsburgh alumni
Living people
Republican Party Maine state senators
Pensacola Christian College alumni
People from Lisbon, Maine
Politicians from Lewiston, Maine
Southern New Hampshire University alumni